Heliosia micra is a moth of the family Erebidae. It was described by George Hampson in 1903. It is found in Australia.

References

 

Nudariina
Moths described in 1903